José Bonifácio is a district in the subprefecture of Itaquera of the city of São Paulo, Brazil.

References 

Districts of São Paulo